The series X-Men: Evolution featured a diverse cast of complicated characters. A common staple of the series was whether a particular person had chosen their allegiances correctly, with several instances of a character switching teams.

X-Men

Teachers
Professor Charles Xavier (voiced by David Kaye) is the team's telepathic mentor and financier. He is very similar to his comic book counterpart, only more casual. Like the comic Professor X, he is still somewhat secretive, if only for the protection of his students. He occasionally visits Juggernaut, who is in suspended animation.
Logan / Wolverine (voiced by Scott McNeil), though similar in most ways to the classic Wolverine, he has been seriously toned down in violence, has a slightly different hairstyle, and is designed to be more of a role model for the students and appears more as a "gruff uncle" type character. He is also in charge of the students' combat and survival training and is famous among the students for his apparently difficult and challenging methods, as well as his strict and unyielding teaching manner. On a side note, he is the only X-Man to change his uniform; at the beginning, he wears an incarnation of his classic orange-black uniform with his characteristic bladed mask, but then swaps it for a dark, maskless uniform very similar to the version found in the Ultimate X-Men comic in the third season. His powers (superhuman senses, strength, durability, agility, and longevity, healing factor, and adamantium claws and skeleton) are identical to his comic incarnation. He also is known to give the students nicknames, for instance, for Kitty Pryde he calls her "Half Pint" along with other names for the other students. 
Ororo Munroe / Storm (voiced by Kirsten Williamson), as her codename implies, is able to harness and manipulate the forces of nature. Storm can summon lightning from a benign sky, manifest violent storms, call up freezing blizzards, and bring all forms of precipitation to bear. She can even harness the power of wind, allowing her to fly. Ororo is known for her calm personality and regal manner, and she was even worshipped as a Goddess in Africa due to her ability to summon the rains. In the comics, Ororo is an only child and an orphan; in Evolution, she has a sister named Vivian and a nephew, Spyke. Storm is the first to notice Evan's powers at his basketball game in New York City. In both Evolution and the comics, Storm is claustrophobic, which is shown in 'African Storm', though the show does not reveal the origin of her ailment (she was trapped under wreckage following the accident that killed her parents). While Storm is one of the X-Men's most popular and recognizable female members, she plays a smaller role in X-Men: Evolution. Her one spotlight episode, "African Storm," puts the emphasis on her teenage nephew, Spyke, although her African origins are heavily touched upon during this episode.
Hank McCoy / Beast (voiced by Michael Kopsa) joins during the second season. Beast is similar to his comic counterpart in most ways, though the Evolution version speaks more casually. He was originally a gym coach and chemistry teacher at Bayville High before his latent transformation into the ape-like Beast could no longer be controlled with the medications he had formulated upon first learning of his mutation. This change of fortune forced him to retire and join the X-Men, where he could continue to teach. It was during the initial discovery of his mutation that he became acquainted with Professor Xavier.

Students
Scott Summers / Cyclops (voiced by Kirby Morrow) is 'somewhat' toned down from his comic book counterpart; he is less stiff and possesses a more open sense of humor. Contrasting with many other incarnations, Cyclops is not the aloof, doubtful loner, but a handsome and confident leader who exudes natural authority, although he is still somewhat standoffish. While the other students tend to look up to him, his competitive nature and closely-held temper get in the way at times. He is the most officious and rule-abiding of the X-Men and the least likely to fool around. After the third season, Cyclops and Jean Grey begin teaching the younger students at the Xavier Institute how to better control and utilize their powers. Like the comics version, he has optic blasts that can only be controlled by special visors made of ruby quartz. This Cyclops also owns, drives, and maintains a car. Magneto once tried to control him by inventing a machine that would let Scott control his blasts at will, but Scott soon destroyed his machine and had to use his visor again.
Jean Grey (voiced by Venus Terzo) was "Miss Popular" of the X-Men: smart, athletic, beautiful, well-liked, and the second-in-command after Cyclops. However, she is more insecure than her comic book counterpart and possesses a jealous streak when it comes to Scott Summers. Unlike many mutants who began as social outcasts and came to find their horizons expanded through their association with the institute, Jean starts out from a high position of status. After the third season, Cyclops and Jean Grey began teaching the younger students at the Xavier Institute how to better control and utilize their powers.Jean Grey's unique telekinetic mutant abilities allow her to manipulate matter through the force of thought alone and generate force fields and tap into the minds of others with telepathic powers. This incarnation of Jean occasionally has trouble controlling her powers and suffered at least one major loss of control as she experienced a sudden surge in their scope.  Various hints dropped throughout the seasons indicate that she, like her original version, is destined to assume the mantle of the Phoenix Force.She also has romantic feelings for Cyclops, but doesn't know how to tell him how she feels, but eventually works up the courage to confess and they become a couple later in the series. Unlike most of her teammates, Jean forgoes the use of a codename. After graduating from high school, Scott and Jean became teachers at the institute. It is hinted that she is afraid of clowns.
Kurt Wagner / Nightcrawler (voiced by Brad Swaile) is the teleporting humorist of the team. The Evolution Nightcrawler is very similar to his comic version and has a friendly big-brother relationship with Cyclops. During his early days at the institute, he was still feeling very insecure about fitting in. In the first season, Kurt was quite immature and childish however he becomes much more mature following season 2. Nightcrawler's Catholicism was not transferred from the comics. Kurt is the biological son of Mystique, but was raised by kind foster parents in Germany (instead of being abandoned by Mystique, she accidentally dropped him over a bridge while escaping Magneto, and when she saw he had been taken in by foster parents, she decided to let him remain with them). He speaks with a German accent, although he makes a concerted effort to use vernacular typical of an American teenager (for instance, he often exclaims "Oh, man!" or "Dude!" when surprised). For much of the show, Nightcrawler uses a holographic image inducer in public to hide his appearance. It is later revealed that Rogue is his adopted sister. Over the course of the series, he and Kitty Pryde develop a very close friendship.
Evan Daniels / Spyke (voiced by Neil Denis), an entirely new character, is Storm's nephew, with the ability to project bonelike spikes from his skin. He is the youngest member of the team. Spyke would much rather play basketball or skateboard than study; he has problems with authority, making him the "rebel" of the main team. Spyke and Quicksilver had an ongoing rivalry since childhood that culminated when Pietro framed Evan for robbery; however, their feud was rarely mentioned after their introductory episode and never mentioned at all past the first season. In the third season, Spyke left to join the Morlocks. He made a guest appearance in the fourth season, where he was seen as a protector of oppressed mutants. In the series finale, he returned to the X-Men to help them fight Apocalypse and rescue his aunt. He was last seen in a group photo with the X-Men, the new mutants, and their allies which may mean he has finally returned to the X-Men. Many critics liked the change of the Spyke character, from a stereotypical teenager to a violent-minded vigilante. Spyke has been compared to the comic character Marrow (both have similar attitudes, powers, and ties to the Morlocks) but the creators have stated that they were unaware of Marrow when the show's production began.
Rogue (voiced by Meghan Black), a serious departure from the comic Rogue, is a reclusive, paranoid goth who speaks with a heavy Southern accent. She has a great deal of angst with respect to her powers, which keep her from ever safely touching anyone. Due to the machinations of Mystique, Rogue initially distrusted the X-Men, but after learning that Mystique tricked her by attacking her posing as members of the X-Men, she accepted their membership. At first, annoyed by Nightcrawler's joking behavior, she becomes close to him after learning that she is his adopted sister, and both renounce Mystique for abusing them.The series established no birth name for Rogue and gave no hints to it after her introductory episode. Rogue's mutant ability allows her to draw upon the aspects of another (memories, habits, speech patterns, powers [if mutant]) through bare skin-to-skin contact. It is uncontrollable and possibly deadly.Rogue was in love with Scott during the first, second, and third season and generally was hostile towards Jean because of it; but eventually, she gets over him and approves of his relationship with Jean. She shows a romantic interest in Gambit during the season three episode, "Dark Horizon, Part 1" (when she kisses him to absorb his powers, although being mind-controlled at this point); in the season four episode, "Cajun Spice", they resume contact, but it is unclear whether she is in love with him. At the end of the season finale, Professor X's vision of the future shows Gambit as part of the extended team of X-Men, with his arm around her, showing that both Rogue and Gambit become a couple.
Kitty Pryde / Shadowcat (voiced by Maggie Blue O'Hara) possesses the mutant ability to become cognitively intangible, allowing her to pass or "phase" through solid objects at will. She initially had a thick valley girl accent, but it was eventually phased out after the first season. She is the second-youngest member of the team; her culinary skills are a constant source of dismay among the others. Kitty led a very sheltered life before joining the X-Men and was initially afraid of Nightcrawler's "demonic" appearance, but she has since grown into a very open-minded and worldly young lady, and she and Nightcrawler eventually develop a very close brother and sister friendship.Kitty attracted the romantic attention of Lance Alvers the moment they met, and he tried to comfort her with his sympathy (Kitty had just developed her powers) but also wanted her to help him steal test answers. When Lance gets out of control, Kitty joins the X-Men instead, although Lance still had feelings for her. At the very beginning of Season 2, Kitty also develops romantic feelings for Lance when he risked his life to save her from a falling mascot statue, and they begin dating. However, during Season 3 when principal Kelly convinced the Brotherhood to gang up on the X-Men, Kitty felt betrayed by Lance and they both realized that as long as they are on rival teams, their relationship would not work out. At the end of Season 4, during their fight against Apocalypse, Avalanche did end up protecting Kitty against Magneto, who was Apocalypse's minion at that time and they reunite.

New Mutants
As a whole, the New Mutants did not have a significant role in the series. They were added in the second season of the show to make the Xavier Institute seem more populated by having several students in the background. During the show's four-season run, the New Mutants remained in the background, and only in a few instances did any of them contribute to an episode's plot. Most often, they were relegated to sub-plots or background gags. As a result, few of them are well-developed as they are; Iceman, Magma and Boom Boom. The younger students are only referred to as the "new recruits" in the actual series; they are commonly called the "New Mutants" by fans because they include several members from the original New Mutants comic book. While Boom Boom is listed under "Neutral Mutants" due to her lack of a direct allegiance to any one party, she did originally attend the Xavier Institute as a "New Mutant".
Bobby Drake/Iceman (voiced by Andrew Francis), the most outgoing of the new recruits, later becomes a standby X-Man to take the place of Spyke. After Spyke's departure, he became a regular in X-Men missions, including being considered one of the more "experienced" students during the season four finale to join Cyclops, Storm, Jean, Beast, Nightcrawler, Rogue, and Shadowcat to fight Apocalypse. He also has the ability to convert his body to ice and to produce ice from his hands.
Samuel Guthrie / Cannonball (voiced by Bill Switzer) is Bobby's more practical-minded friend. Sam's mutant ability allows him to propel himself into the air and is indestructible using this ability. He also deserves mention for nearly beating Wolverine in a motorbike race, though his urge to "go Cannonball" ruined his chances. Tall, gawky, and clumsy, he has unintentionally knocked down several walls in the institute. If he hits something he cannot demolish, he falls over, dazed.
Amara Aquilla/Magma (voiced by Alexandra Carter) is the only New Mutant who was the lead character of an episode ("Cruise Control"). She has a somewhat haughty, "royal" attitude at times, and is easily discouraged when she does not live up to her own expectations. Magma has a physiological connection with the earth and becomes physically ill when she is separated from it for a long period of time (such as when on a boat trip). She also has an unlikely but deep friendship with Tabitha Smith, aka Boom Boom. Magma's appearance has been significantly altered from her comic book incarnation, where she has blond hair and blue eyes; in Evolution, she has brown hair and eyes and tan skin. Amara's mutant ability allows her to harness the power of the earth elements, allowing her to simulate effects associated with volcanic activity. Just like Bobby, she can transform her body, and in this case, into lava.
Jubilation Lee/Jubilee (voiced by Chiara Zanni), unlike the original show, plays a minor role. She retains the playfulness of her comic counterpart, was often involved with Bobby's antics, and seems to have a liking towards him. As a nod towards the original character, she always wears a yellow jacket when not in uniform. She was removed in the third season (after the public revelation of mutants, her parents no longer felt the institute was a good place for her), but appeared in a cameo during the series finale. Jubilee has the ability to generate colorful plasma. She can form this energy into explosive streamers and light shows, which she playfully refers to as "Fireworks".
Rahne Sinclair/Wolfsbane (voiced by Chantal Strand) is a relatively serene individual, only speaking in four episodes and eventually being altogether removed from the cast during the third season, but returned in a cameo during the series finale. She is of Scottish descent and is able to transform into a lupine form. Her name was mispronounced as "Rohn-ee" in "Retreat," but is correctly pronounced as "rain" in "Mainstream".
Jamie Madrox/Multiple (voiced by David A. Kaye (credited as David Kaye)), the youngest of the group, is constantly picked upon by his older peers. He has a hard time controlling his powers, with a running gag that whenever Jamie bumps into something the result is the frequent creation of numerous duplicates. Multiple also seems to have taken a liking to Shadowcat.
Ray Carter/Berzerker (voiced by Tony Sampson) is a departure from the mainstream continuity, where he is an extremely violent. Here, he is fairly mellow, though he still has a temper. He was initially intended to have an ongoing rivalry with Sunspot, but aside from one scene, this was phased out of the show. His power allows him to harness electricity. It is shown in a later episode that he was allied with the Morlocks before he joined Xavier's School and tried to stop Spyke from joining them.
Roberto Da Costa/Sunspot (voiced by Michael Coleman) was shown to be a perfectionist and an overachiever. Roberto's unique mutant ability is derived from the sun, effectively allowing him to become a living solar panel. The energy absorbed from the sun allows Sunspot to "power up" into an all-black radiating form and convert the solar energy into physical strength, thermonuclear thrust for flight, generate a bright orange fiery corona around his body, and absorb and re-channel both heat and light.

Brotherhood of Mutants
The Brotherhood of Mutants had an evolving role throughout the series. While the X-Men represent the ideal of mutant responsibility, the Brotherhood of Mutants represents the reality, wasting their powers on selfish, small-time interests. They were little more than a plot device during the first season (often an excuse to have the X-Men fight somebody) but from the second season onward, they semi-retired from costumed villainy and were most often seen hanging out in their run-down house, only occasionally committing petty crimes to pay for bills and food. Despite their ongoing contempt for the X-Men, the Brotherhood of Mutants (particularly Avalanche and Toad) were portrayed in a sympathetic light; they were easily manipulated by their elders, such as Magneto, Mystique, and even Edward Kelly, but were not truly evil. The Brotherhood of Mutants have been known to team up with their rivals, often voluntarily such as in "Ascension" when they aid Shadowcat's group of X-Men in defeating Magneto (who is being controlled by Apocalypse) and stand side by side with their former enemies at the Xavier Institute. The first time they all worked with the X-Men was to stop the Juggernaut. At the end of the series, the Brotherhood of Mutants has a change into moral heroes and become members of S.H.I.E.L.D.'s Freedom Force division.
Raven Darkholme/Mystique (voiced by Colleen Wheeler) initially resembles her comic counterpart, with her trademark white dress (similar to a qipao) and iconic skull belt. From the second season onwards, Mystique is given a drastic redesign, accentuating her similarity to her son Kurt, and sporting a form-fitting black combat outfit. In earlier appearances, Mystique used her real name as the disguised principal of Bayville High to spy on the X-Men and recruit members of the Brotherhood for Magneto. After her powers are exponentially increased due to an accident on Magneto's part, she parts ways with him and begins to operate under her own agenda. Mystique later becomes instrumental in Apocalypse's reawakening. Her backstory reveals that Mystique adopted a four-year-old Rogue, leaving her to be raised by a foster mother (Irene Adler), and Mystique is also the biological mother of Nightcrawler. Though she cares deeply for her children, her actions usually suggest otherwise. The show's incarnation of Mystique also has a fierce and dangerous temper, and often throws tantrums when annoyed, usually when dealing with Toad.
Lance Alvers/Avalanche (voiced by Christopher Grey), a grungy, hot-headed, and rebellious loner, is the Brotherhood's field leader and is known for his rivalry with the strait-laced Cyclops. Like his comic book counterpart, Avalanche possesses geological manipulation by generating seismic waves from his hands. Avalanche is often irrational and driven by his temper, but as the series progresses, he becomes more mature and pragmatic, taking on a more morally ambiguous role. He is reluctant to be a villain, rather he is angered by societal hatred and contempt for mutants, whether good or evil and has been known to lapse into heroic roles. While Lance is mostly irritated by his teammates, he tends to act as the "caretaker", only committing petty crimes to pay for bills and groceries. When the Brotherhood begins creating disaster scenarios to put them in a heroic light, Lance is the only one who intentionally does anything heroic; he rescues a paraplegic woman from the crashed subway that started it all, and when the final disaster goes wrong, he is the only one who stays to help. Avalanche has a soft spot and a romantic interest in Shadowcat, even joining the X-Men briefly just to be closer to her. At the start of Season 2, Lance makes several attempts to impress Kitty by causing earthquakes during a school assembly; after saving her life, they become lab partners and close friends. It is during this time that the two start dating, in spite of their friends' protests. During the third episode of Season 3, the two break up briefly when Kitty learns that Lance was going to assist Duncan in beating up the X-Men (Cyclops specifically). Lance and Kitty's relationship seemingly ended, realizing that as long as they are on rival teams their relationship would not work out. However, they reunite in the final episode of Season 4. At the end of the series, Lance and his team have a change of heart and join the S.H.I.E.L.D. Freedom Force.
Todd Tolansky/Toad (voiced by Noel Fisher), like his comic book counterpart, is a weak, smart-mouthed, and weaselly punk with extremely poor hygiene (resulting in, among other things, very noticeable body odor) and a wise-guy attitude. On the show, he is often used for comic relief. He seems to revel in his own weirdness with self-deprecating humor and feigned over-confidence. Toad can be seen as Nightcrawler's counterpart, as they both have animal-like appearances (Toad's webbed hands, elongated tongue, red/yellow eyes, bowlegged, hunched stance, frog-like face shape), are superhuman acrobats, have an unusual method of transportation (in Toad's case he tends to jump and squat rather than walk and stand) and are the jokesters of their teams. While Toad is really nothing more than a coward at heart with absolutely no fighting skill and is mostly useless in battle, he tends to act as a burglar or spy, and, in doing so, gains useful information for the team. He is seen in a more sympathetic, heroic role in episode 37, "The Toad, the Witch, and the Wardrobe" when he is nearly killed by Magneto when he saves his love interest Scarlet Witch from him. Like Avalanche, Toad is given another name in X-Men: Evolution (the original being Mortimer Toynbee). He often tries to flirt with Scarlet Witch, though she is usually repulsed by him. His strongest friend in the Brotherhood is Blob, a fellow "freak amongst freaks," and he and Nightcrawler are often depicted as rivals due to their acrobatic abilities, though they are on friendly terms after "The Toad, the Witch, and the Wardrobe". He often acts as a scapegoat for the rest of the Brotherhood, bearing the brunt of the blame for their actions.
Fred Dukes/Blob (voiced by Michael Dobson), as the comic version, is a bully with a big mouth and a small brain. Unlike the comic version, this Blob seems to hide a sensitive side (as seen by the rather obsessive way he treated Jean in the first episode he appeared in, and his later closeness to the rest of the Brotherhood). He is also one of the few characters to change aspects of his physical appearance throughout the series. Most notably his "haircut", but this is because of a prank he received from Boom Boom that Toad recommends he keep.
Pietro Maximoff/Quicksilver (voiced by Richard Ian Cox), unlike Avalanche, he retains most of his original counterpart's personality traits, including his impatience, arrogance, and real name. The similarities end there- this Quicksilver is a self-serving villain who will betray his friends and even family to save himself. He is loyal to his father, Magneto, though only out of convenience. At the end of season 1, he wasn't seen making it out of the explosion on Asteroid M and many fans thought he died, but his unconscious body is actually seen being evacuated out by Spyke in a quick scene, hence his return in season 2. Though he has a hand in betraying his sister Wanda and is initially afraid of her temper and power, he grows to care for his sister as the series progresses. In season 3, Quicksilver becomes the official team leader due to Magneto's influence, and even after Magneto's demise, continues to assume leadership, giving the team some much-needed ambition. Early in the series, he was shown to have a grudge against Spyke; after the first season, this is never mentioned again.
Wanda Maximoff/Scarlet Witch (voiced by Kelly Sheridan) is a tortured young soul. Locked up in an asylum by her father, Magneto, due to his inability to control her powerful mutant ability, she grew bitter and vengeful against the world. She was released from imprisonment by Mystique, who sought to use her in her own revenge against Magneto. Wanda spent much of her introductory series searching for her father, eventually finding and attempting to kill him. However, after being subjected to the powers of Mastermind, she now believes her father to be kind and caring, resulting in a saner, calmer, more well-adjusted Wanda who is fiercely devoted to Magneto's cause. Wanda's unique mutant ability allows her to harness and manipulate the force of probability. Her power, already dangerous in its own right, is easily tainted by her anger and fury, making her all the more deadly. She can use hex bolts and hex spheres to interfere with other mutants' powers, causing them to go haywire, or for attacks to be shot back at the original attacker. She can generally cause bad luck for people, making them trip or drop things when under the influence of her powers. Wanda is also able to affect inanimate objects - things will break, move (sometimes to accomplish a specific goal like trapping someone), and so on.

Acolytes
When the Brotherhood of Mutants fell out of Magneto's favor (due to both incompetence and uncertain loyalty) he created a new team. Though never named on-screen, they are referred to as the Acolytes, named after Magneto's second-most famous team from the comics (the first, of course, is the Brotherhood of Evil Mutants) Sabretooth and Quicksilver were retained, but the rest of the team was brand new. The Acolytes were first referenced in "On Angel's Wings" when Magneto invited Angel to join him (he refused) the team was first revealed during the second-season finale, "Day of Reckoning", where despite being quite smaller in number than the combined forces of the X-Men and the Brotherhood of Mutants, held their own against both. They were the primary threat against the X-Men in season three; until the threat of Apocalypse sidetracks Magneto. Magneto apparently sought to further expand the team, forcing the Brotherhood of Mutants to prove they were worthy of being Acolytes and even trying to recruit Wolverine (he also refused) the team roster does not seem to be stable, as Sabretooth and Mastermind tend to disappear, Quicksilver is never presented as a member in promotional material (despite being one) and in "Dark Horizon" Toad and Blob are briefly seen among the Acolytes.

Erik Lehnsherr/Magneto (voiced by Christopher Judge) is a powerful mutant supremacist. He is essentially unchanged from his comic book version but toned down a bit so that he appears more a manipulator than a terrorist. In addition, the ambiguous nature of Magneto's personality has been changed to make him a more effective villain (though he was seen as a child in a concentration camp), resembling the 1960s version of the character, with an apparent (but unstated) interest solely in mutant dominance, with himself as leader.
Victor Creed/Sabretooth (voiced by Michael Donovan) is a violent brawler who has a deep enmity against Wolverine, but not the psychotic killer of the comics. Little is revealed about Sabretooth except that he had some involvement with Wolverine, Weapon X, and that he is one of Magneto's most loyal followers. Oddly, he was depicted as a loner in the first season, but from the first season's finale ("The Cauldron") onward he was almost never seen without Magneto although his whereabouts after Magneto was kidnapped by Apocalypse is unknown.
Remy LeBeau/Gambit (voiced by Alessandro Juliani) cast as a Long John Silver-type villain, is outwardly similar to the original Gambit but is different in that he is a willing accomplice to Magneto. Trained as a thief, Gambit is an amoral mercenary who will give his services to the highest bidder. He appears to have a soft spot for Rogue (originally meant only as a nod to their relationship in the comics), especially during the season 4 episode, "Cajun Spice", in which he kisses his favorite playing card (the Queen of Hearts, his "lucky lady") during a train journey and then gives her this same card at the end, but whether or not he has a sincere affection for her is unconfirmed. However, in the final sequence at the end of the series, Gambit was seen as part of the extended team of X-Men, with an arm around Rogue. His nickname for Rogue is "Chérie" which is French for darling.
Piotr Rasputin/Colossus (voiced by Michael Adamthwaite) is very similar to his comic counterpart. In this version, he is pressured into working for Magneto, who has abducted and threatened to kill his family. He revealed this to Wolverine and later tried to resist Magneto's threats against his family. When Magneto was defeated by Apocalypse and taken under his control, Colossus returned to Russia. He eventually returned to help the X-Men in their final battle against Apocalypse; although the whereabouts of his family remain unknown at the end of the series. When Charles Xavier saw the future in the mind of Apocalypse, he saw Colossus as one of the future X-Men. In the special feature "X-Men Season 3: X-Posed" on the season 3 DVD, Colossus' sister is specifically mentioned as being Magneto's hostage, with no mention of other family members, contrary (but not contradictory) to what is stated in the series. This was likely an intended plot point for future seasons.
St. John Allerdyce/Pyro (voiced by Trevor Devall) is a mad pyromaniac with a cackling laugh and a broken Australian accent. The original Pyro was more controlled, whereas this version's affinity for destruction and complete ignorance of consequence borders on outright insanity. In one notable scene, he is watching footage of Magneto's supposed demise at the hands of Apocalypse, rewinding, playing back, and laughing several times. He differs from his comic book counterpart in that he needs a constant stream of flame to sustain his power; when Wolverine fights him midway through his repeated viewing of Magneto's death, Wolverine severs his flamethrower pack, and the fires already conjured fade away. The special feature "Cerebro Mutant Files: The Acolytes" on the Season 3 DVD reveals that, like the movie, the name St. John Allerdyce (as Pyro is named in the comics) is simplified to John Allerdyce.
Jason Wyngarde/Mastermind (voiced by Campbell Lane) is the group's telepath, though his membership on the team appears to be unofficial, as he seldom appears. While his comic book counterpart could only cast illusions, this version of Mastermind is also capable of telepathy, as well as reading and even rewriting memories of other people (as he did to Wanda).

Other mutants
Tabitha Smith / Boom-Boom (voiced by Megan Leitch). Tabitha has a troubled past and a criminal father. Originally one of the New Mutants, she felt that she did not fit in at Prof. Xaviers Institute and moved in with the Brotherhood, who were more her style. She often played practical jokes on the boys (such as shaving off Blob's Mohawk while he slept) and abused their hospitality, though they did little to stop her. She left following Mystique's return. Her role in the series was significantly diminished afterward; she lived on her own and appeared mostly in the company of her friend Amara. Her powers are making energy 'time bombs' that can explode at will. In the final episode, she is pictured with the X-Men.
The Morlocks. The Morlocks made several appearances on the show. Like in the comics, the Morlocks made their option of living down in the sewers, because their mutations were far too apparent to stop humans from shunning them from society. The characters included:
Callisto (voiced by Saffron Henderson), the leader of the group, who has enhanced senses. She is more passive and reasonable than her comic-book counterpart.
Caliban (voiced by Michael Dobson) a chalk-white character who is able to detect the presence of other mutants.
Cybelle, an African American female with an acid touch.
 Torpid, a mute little girl with huge hands who possesses a paralyzing touch. She was created exclusively for the series.
Facade, who can blend into his surroundings. He was created exclusively for the series.
Lucid (voiced by Lee Tockar), a froglike mutant who can see through solid objects. He was created exclusively for the series.
Scaleface (who can shapeshift into a fire-breathing reptilian creature) appeared in one episode. She tried to prevent Berzerker from escaping the Morlocks, a nod to their relationship in the comics.
X-23 (voiced by Andrea Libman and then Britt Irvin) is a female clone of Wolverine who was raised since birth to be a killer for HYDRA. She has two claws in each hand instead of three, and a single claw in each foot. At first, X-23 blames Wolverine for her wretched existence and tries to kill him, but relents when she realizes that he had nothing to do with her creation or emotional and mental abuse. In scenes from the future on the final episode, X-23 is found as a member of the X-Men. It is noteworthy in that she was created for and made her debut on X-Men: Evolution, and was later adopted as a comic character.
Warren Worthington III / Angel (voiced by Mark Hildreth) a young multi-millionaire, donned a costume and a mask to perform heroic deeds in New York City, but stopped after his actions garnered negative attention from Magneto. He eventually joins the X-Men in their concerted assault against Apocalypse, and in scenes from the future in the final episode, Angel is shown as a full member of the X-Men.
Forge (voiced by Sam Vincent) in great contrast to his comic counterpart, is a Bayville High student and mutant inventor from the late 1970s who was trapped in a pocket dimension he called "Middleverse" for several years. Only when Nightcrawler found his way there and the X-Men found a way to free him did Forge return, though he was, as he put it, "twenty years late for curfew". While he is an ally of the X-Men, he only appeared once more to test equipment that would enhance Nightcrawler's teleportation range, at the cost of releasing extra-dimensional monsters into the world. He is curiously absent from the final shot of the series, which included the X-Men and the various allies they had gathered throughout the series. He is shown as having a mechanical arm that seems able either to actually shift into flesh or simulate it, and aside from his evident genius displays no other power.
Alex Summers / Alex Masters / Havok (voiced by Matt Hill). Cyclops's younger brother who was long believed to be dead, Alex (who was adopted by the Masters family rather than the Blanding family as his comic counterpart was) is reunited with his brother Scott, though Alex has come under the influence of Magneto, leading Scott away from the X-Men. Eventually, Alex and Scott realize that Magneto has tricked them and helped put an end to his plans. Alex turns down an offer to join the X-Men, preferring to stay in Hawaii and become a professional surfer. Despite this, he agrees to help in the fight against Apocalypse, even donning an X-Men training uniform.
Danielle Moonstar (voiced by Tabitha St. Germain) is a Native American mutant who befriends Kitty. Her powers of psychic projection exposed the worst fears of her neighbors, which resulted in the entire population of her small town moving away and leaving her and her grandfather the only residents of a ghost town. Her story coincidentally parallels that of Forge, the only other Native American in the series.
Irene Adler / Destiny (voiced by Ellen Kennedy) a blind mutant who has visions of future possibilities and events. In "Rogue Recruit", it is implied that Destiny is employed by Magneto, but her true loyalties lie with her longtime friend Mystique. She raised Rogue in Caldecott, Mississippi, waiting for the day in which her potentially unlimited power would manifest. Though Irene lies to Rogue on several occasions (such as telling her that she must always cover her skin due to a phony illness, and convincing her that the X-Men are dangerous mutant hunters), she clearly has genuine affection for the girl.
Dorian Leech (voiced by Danny McKinnon) is a young boy whose mutation nullifies any type of power, both energetic and mutant abilities, within range. His green skin marks him as a mutant, and his mother struggles to protect him from anti-mutant bigots. In his final appearance, Leach plays a vital role in the course of events when Rogue absorbs his powers to vanquish Apocalypse.

HYDRA
Viper, voiced by Lisa Ann Beley. She is the green-haired leader of HYDRA. The character apparently dies while on board her base as it is destroyed.
Omega Red, voiced by Richard Newman. One of Viper's underlings, Omega Red has a previous history with Wolverine that is hinted at but never fully explained. He is depicted as working alongside HYDRA as part of a deal to get revenge on Wolverine for something the Weapon X program did. Wolverine has no memory of who Omega Red is or what they did to him, but he swears vengeance upon them all, including Sabretooth, Wraith, and Maverick.
Gauntlet, voiced by Mark Gibbon, is another member of HYDRA who tries to get back their creation, X-23. Gauntlet appears to have been either genetically altered or possessing a natural mutation that makes him stronger, tougher, and with keener senses than the average human being. Like other agents of HYDRA, he has access to a wide array of tools and equipment that make him a formidable opponent and a dangerous tracker. Unfortunately for Gauntlet, he was aboard the hovercraft with the Supreme HYDRA which X-23 destroyed.

Other villains
En Sabah Nur / Apocalypse (voiced by David Kaye) Hinted at during the second season, Apocalypse became the primary focus of the third and fourth seasons, overshadowing even a fearful Magneto as the primary villain. Though his back story remains largely the same as his comic counterpart, this Apocalypse was sealed away behind three mystic doors in the Himalayas, using Mesmero to help him escape. Once free, Apocalypse quickly proved that even the combined forces of the X-Men and Magneto's Acolytes were no match for him, and set out to use the Eye of Ages to turn all humans into mutants (or as Beast put it, "reshape the world in his image"). This Apocalypse differed greatly from the original version, most notably his initial appearances showed him as an iridescent god-like being who never spoke. During the series finale, he was altered to more closely resemble his original appearance by becoming a blue cyborg with a penchant for overly dramatic dialogue, which led to mixed reactions from fans.
Vincent/Mesmero (voiced by Ron Halder) is little more than a servant of Apocalypse in X-Men: Evolution. While Apocalypse was sealed away in the Himalayas, Mesmero helped track down the items that would help free him. He traveled with a circus (It is implied that he worked there before his time with Apocalypse as he is found there once Apocalypse discards him) and used his hypnotic powers to recruit the X-Men, then Gambit, and later Rogue alone to help free Apocalypse. In contrast to his comic counterpart, this Mesmero looks like a normal human with strange green tattoos on his body rather than a green skin tone. Professor Xavier at one point hints that the bulk of Mesmero's power is channeled from Apocalypse; after being abandoned, Mesmero does not show any powers and is easily captured and interrogated.
Cain Marko / Juggernaut (voiced by Paul Dobson). In Juggernaut's first appearance on the show, it took the combined forces of the X-Men and the Brotherhood to stop him from harming Xavier and Mystique. However, in his second appearance, a substantially more experienced X-Men team managed to defeat Juggernaut with the help of the environment. The most noteworthy differences between the comic Juggernaut and the Evolution Juggernaut are that he is now Xavier's half-brother rather than his stepbrother and that he is now a mutant whose powers were activated by "mysticism". Another difference is the helmet he wore had buckle-like locks on it allowing for it to be easily taken off unlike his previous incarnation in the previous X-Men animated series where it was bolted on. However, Juggernaut still possessed the same general weakness from telepathic assault and his helmet was stated in his first appearance to still provide protection.
David Haller (voiced by Kyle Labine). Was altered slightly from the comics. He more closely resembled his father, Professor X, and had inherited his psionic powers, but here Legion was also able to shapeshift between his various personalities. Originally, Legion's personalities developed due to mental disorders; in Evolution however, they are manifestations of repressed feelings. David Haller, the "true" personality, though disappointed in his father's absence, holds no real hostility, and seems to have no discernible powers. The dominant personality, Lucas, a Scottish punk, demonstrates a hatred of Xavier and believes that he was abandoned in favor of other mutants. He has psychic abilities superior to Jean's (formidable by this point in the series) and even caused Professor X's attempt to suppress him to backfire. Finally, a young, mute boy named Ian possessed pyrokinesis, including the ability to create fire at will. His motivations remain unknown, but it seems he sided with Lucas.
Bolivar Trask (voiced by John Novak) a former S.H.I.E.L.D. agent as noted by his comment about learning of mutants through his involvement with S.H.I.E.L.D. is a militant follower of the anti-mutant cause and he secretly developed the Sentinel prototype underneath Bayville. He was arrested for what happened and was later released by Nick Fury and allowed to create an entire batch of Sentinels to combat Apocalypse.
The Sentinels only appeared twice in the series: the first time as a single prototype that was unleashed in New York and the second time as several units in S.H.I.E.L.D.'s first line of defense against Apocalypse. Unlike the original Sentinel robots in the comics, these are not authorized and even got Bolivar Trask arrested. The design from the comics was also changed, making this Sentinel more complex-looking than the comics' version, giving it some abilities not seen with its comic counterparts.
Edward Kelly (voiced by Dale Wilson) was the second principal of Bayville High (the first, Ms. Darkholme, aka Mystique, had vanished) and carried suspicions about the mutant teens which became full-blown prejudice when they were publicly revealed, causing him to make reforms at the high school. Later, he ran for mayor of Bayville competing with the falsely heroic Brotherhood for media attention, a nod to his career as a politician in the comics.
Duncan Matthews (voiced by Vincent Gale) is the stereotypical jock/football player. In his earliest appearances, he was little more than the local high school jerk before becoming a rival to Scott for the attention of Jean Grey. When mutants were outed through the entire school, he began harassing Scott in disgust.Despite developing a hatred of mutants himself, Duncan even momentarily teams up with The Brotherhood to try to ridicule Scott in front of the whole school, with minimal success. In season 4, Duncan returns with even more of a hatred for mutants, as he began terrorizing random mutants in the street, arousing the wrath of Spyke. He is later seen with his friends trying to kill him with mining guns, but are eventually taken down by the X-Men and the Morlocks, and arrested right afterward by the police.
Hungan (voiced by Blu Mankuma) is a witch doctor from Storm's tribe. He is jealous of Storm because her powers over the weather made her a more venerable idol in their African village. Because of this he came to America to seek revenge and drains Storm's powers using her fears of claustrophobia to help him do so. Hungan captures her will into his scepter, giving him the ability to control her body. The X-Men eventually located Hungan and his tribesmen but he uses the mind-controlled Storm to attack them. Spyke uses his powers to shatter the crystal atop Hungan's scepter, releasing Storm from his control. Angrily, Storm engulfs the Hungan in a force of wind that threw him into the sea. Afterward Hungan's tribe disappears into the mist. It is unclear if he is a mutant, relies on magic, or a combination of the two. Hungan's name is a Haitian term referring to the chief voodoo priest.

Other characters
Amanda Sefton, voiced by Moneca Stori, is Kurt Wagner's human girlfriend. Amanda is sweet yet shy, she discovered Kurt's mutation on her own but remained deeply attracted to him. She is one of the few humans of Bayville High who does not shun mutants. Despite being Caucasian in the comics, Amanda's ethnicity was changed to mixed African American/Eastern European and unlike her comic book incarnation, she is not a practitioner of sorcery.
Margali Szardos, voiced by Teryl Rothery, is Amanda Sefton's mother, who forbids her from seeing Kurt after he and Toad get into a fight that wrecks much of her house. Though she still has her comic counterpart's European heritage, she has no previous connection to Kurt and is not a sorceress.
Webber Torque/Arcade, voiced by Gabe Khouth, is a freshman computer whiz. Mystique, posing as a girl called Risty Wilde, gets him to hack into Cerebro (which he thinks is merely a high-tech, interactive video game) so that she can steal data about Scarlet Witch. In the comics, Arcade is an obnoxious, flamboyant paid assassin, but in Evolution he is a normal, harmless (though over-enthusiastic) student.
Gabrielle Haller, voiced by Louise Vallance, is Professor Xavier's ex-wife and the mother of Legion. The two married young and divorced because Xavier dedicated too much time to his study of mutants. Unbeknownst to him, however, Gabrielle was pregnant at the time of their separation and decided to raise their son by herself. In the comics, Gabrielle was, like Magneto, a Holocaust survivor. She and Xavier were lovers and had their son out of wedlock, though this version of Gabrielle also chose to hide David's existence from his father.
Paul, voiced by Neil Denis, is a blond schoolmate of Scott Summers and was one of his best friends. He made several appearances in the series, the last a look of utter bewilderment when the X-Men were outed on TV.
Taryn Fujioka, voiced by Janyse Jaud, is a brown-haired, attractive Japanese American girl who has a crush on Scott. At first, she is Jean's best friend, but when Jean starts to develop feelings for Scott herself, becomes her most bitter rival. Eventually, she and Scott start to date, in part because Jean never tried to date Scott. However, when Scott was outed as a mutant, she shunned him.
Steve Rogers/Captain America was a government-sponsored superhero who fought for the Allies in World War II. With Wolverine's help, he liberated Auschwitz (called a POW camp in the show due to censors) in Poland and rescued a young Magneto. The super-soldier serum that gave Captain America his powers was slowly killing him, however, and he was cryogenically frozen.
Risty Wilde, voiced by Nicole Oliver, was the assumed persona Mystique used to remain close to her adopted daughter Rogue. She was a goth-punk from England (more specifically Manchester, but her accent is closer to that of the Home Counties; possibly done to avoid the American stereotype of English people being Londoners) with purple hair, and from the beginning of the second season, became fast friends with Rogue. The Risty persona was also used as a cover for Mystique to obtain data from the Xavier Institute. After the public revelation of mutants, Risty disappeared, allegedly because her parents had made her stay in England due to the mutant scandal (Mystique had actually been locked away in Area 51). Accidental skin contact with Rogue at a concert caused Mystique to lose control of her power, finally revealing to Rogue that Risty had been a false identity all along. Due to the character's purple hair and British accent, many fans assumed she had been modeled after Psylocke. The producers insist that it was a coincidence, and the two are unrelated.
Nick Fury (voiced by Jim Byrnes) is the gruff leader of the secret government agency called S.H.I.E.L.D. He has helped the X-Men on occasion, mostly when it benefits his own agenda. This is the last incarnation of Fury to be white; all subsequent renderings are black.
Agatha Harkness, voiced by Pauline Newstone. She gives Scarlet Witch training in various disciplines that helps her control her powers and is also the person Nightcrawler turns to for help when his mother, Mystique is turned into stone by Apocalypse. Agatha does demonstrate supernatural powers on the show by putting out a fire and other magical tricks.
Dr. Deborah Risman, voiced by Lisa Ann Beley. A character created for Evolution, Dr. Risman, after discovering the Weapon X project that created Wolverine, worked to create a perfect soldier. She failed 22 times; the 23rd was the only success and became X-23. When X-23 escapes, Dr. Risman defects from Hydra to Nick Fury and S.H.I.E.L.D. because of the moral implications of the project while hoping S.H.I.E.L.D. can recapture X-23 before any harm is done. When the character X-23 was adapted into the mainstream Marvel universe, Deborah Risman was replaced with a similar character named Sarah Kinney.
Rama-Tut: An alien who came to Earth (Ancient Egypt, to be precise) where he became the land's supreme ruler. When he saw a young mutant, who would eventually become Apocalypse, as a threat to his rule, he intended to have him eliminated. The scheme backfired due to Apocalypse's mutant abilities and combat skills, which made Rama-Tut flee for his life to parts unknown. He only appears in historical flashbacks at the end of the third season.

References

 
Lists of X-Men characters
Lists of Marvel Comics animated series characters
Lists of characters in American television animation